Vikentije (II) (secular name Vitomir Prodanov, Витомир Проданов; 23 August 1890 – 5 July 1958) was the fourth partriach of the reunified Serbian Orthodox Church, from 1950 until his death.

Early life 
Vitomir Prodanov was born on August 23, 1890, in the village of Bačko Petrovo Selo, then in the Hungarian part of Austria-Hungary. He was born into the family of Đorđe and Jelka Prodanov. He completed his elementary education in Bačko Petrovo Selo in 1901. After that, he entered the Serbian Gymnasium in Novi Sad from which he graduated in 1909. He continued his higher education in the Serbian Orthodox Theology School in Sremski Karlovci, graduating in 1913. He then returned to Bačko Petrovo Selo as a teacher. On 1 June 1917, Bishop Georgije Letić of Eparchy of Temišvar appointed him consistorial sub-notary for the Diocese of Temišvar (now better known as Timisoara, Romania).

On 18 August 1917, Prodanov took monastic vows in Bezdin Monastery (in what is now Romania) before Archimandrite Issac Došen and was given the name Vikentije (eng. Vicentius). He was ordained a deacon on 12 September by Bpishop Georgije. In 1919, he was transferred to the post of a consistorial notary of the Eparchy of Bačka. He was raised to the dignity of protodeacon and then archdeacon. From 1921 to 1932 he served as secretary of the executive board of Serbian monasteries. During this time he continued his education at the Philosophical Faculty in Belgrade studying National and Byzantine History. He graduated in 1929. On 31 October 1929, he was ordained a hieromonk, and on 3 December, he was raised to the rank of archimandrite. In 1932, Vikentije was elected Secretary-General of the Holy Synod of the Serbian Orthodox Church. He remained in this position until he was elected titular bishop of Marča, on 4 July 1932. He was consecrated by Serbian Patriarch Varnava, assisted by bishops Irinej of Bačka, Serafim of Raška, and Prizren, Sava of Srem, and Platon of Banja Luka.

Vikentije was a historian and a member of the Society of Historians of Vojvodina. He also was editor-in-chief of its gazette.

Bishop 
Vikentije remained an auxiliary bishop until 1939 when he was elected Bishop of Zletovo and Strumica. In 1940, he was additionally assigned the task of administrating the Eparchy of Ohrid and Bitola. After the Germans and Bulgarians occupied his eparchies in 1941, he was exiled by Bulgarian fascists and fled to Belgrade. After World War II, the Communist regime of Yugoslavia did not allow him to return to his duties because they wanted to create a separate Macedonian Orthodox Church. From 1947 to 1950, Vikentije was the administrator of the Eparchy of Žiča.

Patriarch 
Vikentije was elected Serbian Patriarch on 14 July 1950. He placed enormous energy into trying to resolve the problem of Pension Security funds for priests of the Serbian Church. Vikentije was the first Serbian Patriarch to visit Russia in almost 50 years. He was strongly opposed to the splitting of the Serbian Orthodox Church and the creation of a separate Macedonian Church.

Patriarch Vikentije died on 5 July 1958 under mysterious circumstances (like Patriarch Varnava) after a session of the Holy Assembly of bishops at which the assembly rejected suggestions from the communist regime to approve the establishment of a separate Macedonian Orthodox Church. He was buried in the tomb of Metropolitan Mihailo in the St. Michael's Cathedral in Belgrade.

See also 
 List of 20th-century religious leaders

References

1890 births
1958 deaths
People from Bečej
Vikentije II
20th-century Serbian people
20th-century Eastern Orthodox bishops
Burials at St. Michael's Cathedral (Belgrade)